Davide Xamin (born 29 August 1996) is a professional footballer who plays as a defensive midfielder for Bassano. He made his professional debut on 24 February 2016 in the Coppa Lega Pro against U.S. Cremonese.

References

External links

1996 births
Living people
Australian soccer players
Italian footballers
Association football midfielders
U.S. Pergolettese 1932 players